Soulrocker is the ninth studio album by Michael Franti & Spearhead, released on June 3, 2016 by Fantasy Records. He collaborated with the Jamaican producers Stephen McGregor and Dwayne "Supa Dups" Chin-Quee. A tour in support of the album was announced in February.

Critical reception

Writing for Exclaim!, Ryan B. Patrick praised the album's "overpowering sincerity and musicianship".

Track listing
All tracks composed by Michael Franti
 "Crazy for You" (3:39)
 "My Lord" (3:55)
 "Get Myself to Saturday" (4:18)
 "Summertime Is in Our Hands" (3:48)
 "We Are All Earthlings" (3:44)
 "Still Standing" (3:46)
 "Good to Be Alive Today" (4:14)
 "My Favorite Wine Is Tequila" (4:08)
 "Once a Day" (3:57)
 "We Do This Every Day" (4:14)
 "I Got Love for Ya" (3:58)
 "Do You Feel the Way That I Do?" (4:56)
 "Love Will Find a Way" (3:42)

Personnel

 Atanas Babaleski – engineer
 Mike Blankenship – piano
 Chelsea Boisen – production assistant
 Jay Bowman – assistant engineer, engineer, mixing
 Yasmine Brown – background vocals
 Mitchum Chin – electric guitar
 Dwayne Chin-Quee – additional production, drum programming, engineer, keyboards, mixing, producer, vocals, background vocals
 Matthew Desrameux – engineer
 F.A.M.E.S. – conductor
 Michael Franti – bass, acoustic guitar, mixing, producer, vocals
 Dean Fraser – saxophone
 Chris Gehringer – mastering
 Giorgi Hristovski – concert sound engineer
 Peter Jensen – engineer
 Masaki Koike – art direction, design
 Oleg Kondratenko – conductor
 Stephen McGregor – bass, drum programming, engineer, keyboards, producer, background vocals
 Niko Marzouca – engineer, mixing
 Randy Miller – orchestral arrangements
 Samson Rawls – assistant engineer, engineer, background vocals
 Sonna Rele – vocals
 Nambo Robinson – trombone
 Rafael Rodriguez – trumpet
 Polly Snowden – cover photo
 Rhiannon Snyder – production assistant
 Supa Dups – vocals
 Bulby York – horn engineer

Charts

References

2016 albums
Michael Franti albums